María Montez is a Santo Domingo Metro station on Line 2. It was open on 1 April 2013 as part of the inaugural section of Line 2 between María Montez and Eduardo Brito. It is currently the western terminus of the line. The adjacent station is Pedro Francisco Bonó.

This is an underground station built below Avenida John F. Kennedy. It is named in honor of Maria Montez.

References

Santo Domingo Metro stations
2013 establishments in the Dominican Republic
Railway stations opened in 2013